iMusical or iMusical: The Improvised Musical!, is one of the premiere shows under regular production by Washington Improv Theater (WIT).  Created by Travis Ploeger (I Eat Pandas, Chicago City Limits) in October 2006, this audience and critical favorite regularly performs at Flashpoint in Washington, DC.  In the fall of 2008, they began performing in the Source Theater, along with the other WIT productions.  In 2009, they did a series of shows at Cape May Stage, in Cape May, NJ.

iMusical is an improvised musical, in which the cast of singing improvisers create all of the scenes and songs on-the-spot based on audience suggestion.  They have performed to standing ovations at the Baltimore Improv Festival, the Philadelphia Improv Festival and the Del Close Marathon (Upright Citizens Brigade Theater), and in 2007 did a performance at the Kennedy Center.  The Washington Post called the show "amusing," and "spot on," and gives it a coveted "star" recommendation when listed.    They are also a favorite of the DC Theater Scene site.

References

Improvisational theatre
Improvisational troupes

External links